The 1997 Estonian Figure Skating Championships were held in Tallinn from February 14 to 16, 1997. Skaters competed in the disciplines of men's singles, ladies' singles, pair skating, and ice dancing on the senior and junior levels.

Senior results

Men
4 participants

Ladies
4 participants

Pairs

Ice dancing

Junior results
The 1997 Estonian Junior Figure Skating Championships took place in Tallinn from March 28 through 30, 1997.

Men

Ladies
12 participants

Pairs

Ice dancing
4 participants

References

Figure Skating Championships
Estonian Figure Skating Championships, 1997
Estonian Figure Skating Championships